Franciscus Xaverius Seda (4 October 1926 – 31 December 2009), popularly known as Frans Seda, was an Indonesian finance minister in the early days of Suharto's presidency. He also served as a minister during the final days of Indonesia's founding President Sukarno's rule in 1966. He is one of the most well-known figures from the eastern province of Nusa Tenggara Timur.

He served as  plantation minister from 1964 to 1966, agriculture minister in 1966, finance minister from 1966 to 1968 and transportation minister from 1968 to 1973. Seda was a former chairman of the Indonesian Catholic Party and a senior advisor to the Indonesian Democratic Party of Struggle (PDI-P) Party.

Honours
: Honorary Member of the Order of Australia (AM) (1999)

References 

1926 births
2009 deaths
Finance Ministers of Indonesia
Indonesian economists
Indonesian Roman Catholics
Honorary Members of the Order of Australia
People from East Nusa Tenggara
Agriculture ministers of Indonesia
Transport ministers of Indonesia